Perth, Western Australia hosts a variety of unique and biologically diverse habitats found nowhere else on Earth. Many of these habitats include islands. Islands provide habitat and safe refuge for endangered native fauna as they are free of invasive species and the pressures of human development. Coastal islands of this region heavily feature limestone as their base structure, while the inland islands are predominantly made of serpentine soil.

Coastal islands

The coastal islands of the Perth metropolitan region are:

Satellite islands of Rottnest Island

Inland islands

Inland islands include those located in the Swan River, Canning River, and Beeliar Wetlands.

See also
 List of islands of Western Australia
 Perth Water

References

Perth
 
Islands